Wang Yiwu (born 21 August 1975) is a Chinese former swimmer who competed in the 1996 Summer Olympics.

References

1975 births
Living people
Chinese male breaststroke swimmers
Olympic swimmers of China
Swimmers at the 1996 Summer Olympics
Asian Games medalists in swimming
Asian Games gold medalists for China
Asian Games silver medalists for China
Swimmers at the 1994 Asian Games
Medalists at the 1994 Asian Games
20th-century Chinese people